My Lupe and My Horse is a 1944 Mexican western comedy film directed by Carlos Toussaint. It stars María Luisa Zea, Julio Villarreal and Fernando Fernández. The film was of the "ranchera" genre.

References

External links
 

1944 films
1940s Western (genre) comedy films
Mexican black-and-white films
Mexican Western (genre) comedy films
1944 comedy films
1940s Mexican films